Ellis Ferreira and Jan Siemerink were the defending champions, but competed this year with different partners. Ferreira teamed up with Patrick Galbraith and lost in quarterfinals to tournament winners Donald Johnson and Francisco Montana, while Siemerink teamed up with Menno Oosting and lost in first round to Pablo Albano and Àlex Corretja.

Donald Johnson and Francisco Montana won the title by defeating Jacco Eltingh and Paul Haarhuis 7–6, 2–6, 7–6 in the final.

Seeds
The top four seeds received a bye to the second round.

Draw

Finals

Top half

Bottom half

References

External links
 Official results archive (ATP)
 Official results archive (ITF)

Doubles